Óscar Rigoberto Lee-Chong Pinilla (born 20 March 1965) is a Chilean former international footballer who played as a midfielder.

Club career
Lee-Chong played for a number of clubs in Chile, across the top three divisions. In 1991, he turned down a move to Colo-Colo.

International career
Lee-Chong only made one appearance for the full Chilean national team, playing the last few minutes after coming on as a substitute for Iván Zamorano in a 1–1 draw with Bolivia in qualification for the 1998 FIFA World Cup.

Personal life
Lee-Chong's father, Chong Lee Lam (known in Chile as Benito Lee Chong Lam), fled his native China to avoid the rising tensions between China and Japan, as well as the Chinese Civil War, arriving in Chile in 1928. He went on to run a butchers shop in Santiago, and had six children, including Óscar, as well as Luis, who also went on to play football.

His son, Felipe, and nephew, Jaime Carreño, are also professional footballers.

Following his retirement, Lee-Chong went on to work as a chef in Pucón, and has his own restaurant - La Revancha del Chino Lee Chong.

Career statistics

International

References

1965 births
Living people
Chilean people of Chinese descent
Chilean footballers
Chile international footballers
Association football midfielders
Chilean Primera División players
Primera B de Chile players
Segunda División Profesional de Chile players
Universidad de Chile footballers
Club Deportivo Universidad Católica footballers
Coquimbo Unido footballers
Naval de Talcahuano footballers
Deportes Concepción (Chile) footballers
C.D. Antofagasta footballers
Deportes Temuco footballers
Club Deportivo Palestino footballers
Rangers de Talca footballers